Canpotex, short for Canadian Potash Exporters , is a Canadian potash exporting and marketing firm, incorporated in 1970 and operating since 1972. Based in Saskatchewan, Canpotex manages the entire Saskatchewan potash exporting industry (excluding Canadian and US sales), including transportation and delivery.

Canpotex is the world's largest exporter of potash, selling over 10 million tonnes of potash every year, representing about one-third of global capacity. The global potash market was considered a duopoly between Canpotex and Belarusian Potash Company (BPC), a similar consortium which exported Belarusian (Belaruskali) and Russian potash (Uralkali); until the BPC marketing venture failed in 2013, the two collectively controlled 70% of global potash exports.

Member producers
Canpotex is wholly owned by its two member producers:
The Mosaic Company
Nutrien

Facilities

Canpotex operates over 5,500 specialised covered hopper cars for inland transportation of potash from landlocked Saskatchewan to ports, and operates solely on Canadian Pacific Railway lines. In 2011, Canpotex started on the construction of a new $55 million rail car maintenance yard near the town of Lanigan, Saskatchewan used to perform maintenance and manage the inventory of railcars.

The majority of its potash is shipped overseas to Asian, Latin American, and Oceanic markets through Neptune Terminals, partly owned by Canpotex, in North Vancouver, British Columbia. Since 1997, Canpotex has additionally exported through Portland Terminals (owned by Canpotex and operated by Kinder Morgan) in Portland, Oregon. Canpotex additionally ships smaller quantities of potash through the St. Lawrence Seaway via Thunder Bay, Ontario, and has access to ports on the East Coast of the United States and Gulf of Mexico.

Ships
Canpotex has committed $900 million to the manufacture of 15 cargo vessels.  The first of these vessels, the U-Sea Saskatchewan, built as a joint venture with Ultrabulk received its first load of 58,000 metric tons of potash in the Port of Vancouver in November 2010.  The U-Sea Saskatchewan was built by Imabari Shipbuilding of Japan and is capable of carrying 60,000 metric tons. Other ships include the Ultra Colonsay.

References

Companies based in Saskatoon
Transport companies of Canada